Moravecké Pavlovice is a municipality and village in Žďár nad Sázavou District in the Vysočina Region of the Czech Republic. It has about 50 inhabitants.

Administrative parts
The village of Habří is an administrative part of Moravecké Pavlovice.

References

Villages in Žďár nad Sázavou District